Kasold is a surname. Notable people with the surname include: 

Michelle Kasold (born 1987), American field hockey player
Bruce E. Kasold (born 1951), American judge